Kieran Kelly is a former senior inter county hurling player for Antrim and McQuillans of Ballycastle. Kelly usually played in the full-back position when playing with Antrim. Kelly represented Ireland in the Senior Hurling/Shinty Internationals in 2002. He won an Ulster Senior Hurling Championship medal with Antrim in 2007 during a 2-24 to 0-04 win over Down.

External links
McQuillans Official GAA Website

Antrim inter-county hurlers
Ballycastle McQuillan hurlers
Living people
Year of birth missing (living people)